Barbara Paulus was the defending champion but lost in the semifinals to Conchita Martínez.

Manuela Maleeva-Fragnière won in the final 6–4, 6–0 against Martínez.

Seeds
A champion seed is indicated in bold text while text in italics indicates the round in which that seed was eliminated.

  Chris Evert (second round)
  Natasha Zvereva (first round)
  Manuela Maleeva-Fragnière (champion)
  Conchita Martínez (final)
  Claudia Kohde-Kilsch (first round)
  Lori McNeil (first round)
  Sandra Cecchini (first round)
  Catarina Lindqvist (second round)

Draw

External links
 1989 European Open Draw

WTA Swiss Open
European Open - Singles